The Miranshahi were a collateral branch of the Aq Qoyunlu clan that was founded as a result of the union between Sidi-Ahmad ibn Miranshah Timuri and Uzun Hasan's daughter Ruqaya-Sultan.

References

Sources 
 

Tribes of the Aq Qoyunlu